12 teams took part in the league with FC Spartak Moscow winning the championship.

League standings

Results

Top scorers
17 goals
 Vasily Buzunov (ODO Sverdlovsk)

16 goals
 Nikita Simonyan (Spartak Moscow)

15 goals
 Yuri Belyayev (CDSA Moscow)

14 goals
 Anatoli Isayev (Spartak Moscow)

13 goals
 Valentin Ivanov (Torpedo Moscow)

12 goals
 Alakbar Mammadov (Dynamo Moscow)
 Eduard Streltsov (Torpedo Moscow)

11 goals
 Avtandil Chkuaseli (Dinamo Tbilisi)
 Ivan Mozer (Spartak Moscow)

9 goals
 Boris Khasaya (Dinamo Tbilisi)
 Pyotr Ponomarenko (Shakhtyor Stalino)
 Viktor Sokolov (Lokomotiv Moscow)
 Vitali Vatskevich (Burevestnik Kishinyov)

References

 Soviet Union - List of final tables (RSSSF)

Soviet Top League seasons
1
Soviet
Soviet